The Society for Experimental Biology and Medicine (abbreviated SEBM) is a nonprofit scientific society dedicated to promoting research in the biomedical sciences.

Founding
The SEBM was founded in 1903, after Samuel J. Meltzer proposed founding a society dedicated to experimental biology and medicine. Meltzer then teamed up with Graham Lusk to invite eight New York scientists to a conference at Lusk's home, where they discussed the possibility of founding a biomedical society. At the conference, the attendees uniformly agreed to appoint a committee for a permanent society.

Journal
The SEBM's official journal is Experimental Biology and Medicine, published by SAGE Publications. It was founded in 1904 as the Proceedings of the Society for Experimental Biology and Medicine, and obtained its current name in 2001.

References

External links

Non-profit organizations based in Washington, D.C.
Organizations established in 1903
Biology organizations
1903 establishments in New York (state)
Medical associations based in the United States